The 2002 African Cup of Nations was the 23rd edition of the Africa Cup of Nations, the association football championship of Africa (CAF). It was hosted by Mali. Just like in 2000, the field of sixteen teams was split into four groups of four. Cameroon won its fourth championship (repeating as champions), beating Senegal on penalty kicks 3–2 after a goalless draw.

Host selection 
Bids :
 Algeria
 Botswana
 Egypt
 Ethiopia
 Mali

The organization of the 2002 Africa Cup of Nations was awarded to Mali on 5 February 1998 by the CAF Executive Committee meeting in Ouagadougou, Burkina Faso during the 1998 African Cup of Nations. Voters had a choice between five countries : Algeria, Botswana, Egypt, Ethiopia and Mali.

This was the first time that Mali had hosted the competition.

Qualification 

 
 
  (holders)
 
 
 
 
 
  (hosts)

Squads

Venues

First round 
Teams highlighted in green progress to the Quarter Finals.

Group A

Group B

Group C

Group D

Knockout stage

Quarterfinals

Semifinals

Third place match

Final

Scorers 
3 goals

  Patrick M'Boma
  Salomon Olembé
  Julius Aghahowa

2 goals

  Hazem Emam
  Isaac Boakye
  Bassala Touré
  Hicham Zerouali
  Salif Diao

1 goal

  Nassim Akrour
  Nasreddine Kraouche
  Moumouni Dagano
  Amadou Touré
  Samuel Eto'o
  Lucien Mettomo
  Marc-Vivien Foé
  Papi Kimoto
  Shabani Nonda
  Yves Yuvuladio
  Mido
  Kandia Traoré
  Prince Akim Daye
  Kelvin Sebwe
  George Weah
  Mamadou Bagayoko
  Dramane Coulibaly
  Seydou Keita
  Rachid Benmahmoud
  Yakubu
  Garba Lawal
  Souleymane Camara
  Lamine Diatta
  Papa Bouba Diop
  El Hadji Diouf
  Thabo Mngomeni
  Siyabonga Nomvete
  Sibusiso Zuma
  Gift Kampamba

CAF Team of the Tournament 
Goalkeeper
  Tony Sylva

Defenders

  Taribo West
  Rigobert Song
  Ifeanyi Udeze
  Hany Ramzy

Midfielders
  Seydou Keita
  Rafik Saifi
  Patrick M'Boma
  Sibusiso Zuma

Forwards
  Julius Aghahowa
  El Hadji Diouf

External links 

 Details at RSSSF

 
International association football competitions hosted by Mali
African Cup Of Nations, 2002
African Cup Of Nations, 2002
Nations, 2002
Africa Cup of Nations tournaments
African Cup of Nations 
African Cup of Nations